Saint Victorinus may refer to:

Victorinus of Pettau, bishop and third century Christian writer
Victorinus of Camerino, bishop and saint
A bishop of Assisi and martyr 
A martyr and saint who was a companion of Placidus, Christian martyr
A martyr and saint at Evreux (see Maximus of Evreux)